Newaya Maryam (throne name Wedem Asfare or Gemma Asfare) was Emperor of Ethiopia from 1372 to 1382, and a member of the Solomonic dynasty. He was the eldest son of Newaya Krestos.

Reign
During his reign, Haqq ad-Din II of the Walasma dynasty gained control of the kingdom of Ifat on the southeastern frontier of Ethiopia in 1376, and began raids against the Ethiopian Empire. He then characterized his expedition as a jihad against the Christian infidels. According to E. A. Wallis Budge, the Royal Chronicles state that "little was known about" Newaya Maryam, and he died without issue. He was buried at Asar, but his descendant Emperor Baeda Maryam I had his body re-interred at the church of Atronsa Maryam.

Notes 

1382 deaths
14th-century monarchs in Africa
14th-century emperors of Ethiopia
Solomonic dynasty
Year of birth unknown